Mario Francesco Prezioso (born 15 April 1996) is an Italian professional footballer who plays as a central midfielder for  club Ancona.

Club career
On 30 January 2020, he moved to Serie B club Cosenza on loan.

On 26 September 2020, he joined Serie C club Modena on loan.

On 21 July 2021, he returned to Virtus Francavilla on a permanent basis and signed a two-year contract.

On 23 June 2022, Prezioso joined Ancona until June 2024.

References

External links

1996 births
People from Avellino
Sportspeople from the Province of Avellino
Footballers from Campania
Living people
Italian footballers
Association football midfielders
S.S.C. Napoli players
A.S. Melfi players
S.S. Teramo Calcio players
Virtus Francavilla Calcio players
A.C. Carpi players
U.S. Vibonese Calcio players
Cosenza Calcio players
Modena F.C. 2018 players
U.S. Ancona 1905 players
Serie C players